I Kill, You Kill or Io uccido, tu uccidi is a 1965 Italian comedy film directed by Gianni Puccini starring the comic duo Franco and Ciccio.

Cast
Franco Franchi	as 	Franco (segment "Cavalleria Rusticana, oggi")
Ciccio Ingrassia	as 	Turiddu (segment "Cavalleria Rusticana, oggi")
Franca Polesello	as 	Lola - Franco's Wife (segment "Cavalleria Rusticana, oggi")
Rosalba Neri	as 	Turiddu's Wife (segment "Cavalleria Rusticana, oggi")
Enrico Viarisio	as 	(segment "La danza delle ore")
Paolo Panelli	as 	(segment "La danza delle ore")
Margaret Lee	as 	(segment "La danza delle ore")
Daniela Igliozzi	as 	(segment "La danza delle ore")
Mario Siletti	as 	(segment "La danza delle ore")
Eugenio Cappabianca	as 	(segment "La danza delle ore")
Emmanuelle Riva	as 	(segment "La donna che viveva sola")
Jean-Louis Trintignant	as 	(segment "La donna che viveva sola")
Dominique Boschero	as 	(segment "La donna che viveva sola")
Stella Monclar	as 	(segment "La donna che viveva sola")
Mario Colli	as 	(segment "La donna che viveva sola")

External links
 

1965 films
1960s Italian-language films
1965 comedy films
Italian comedy films
1960s Italian films